A referendum on the Amsterdam Treaty was held in Denmark on 28 May 1998. It was approved by 55.1% of voters with a turnout of 76.2%. The treaty subsequently came into effect on 1 May 1999.

Background
The Danish parties and lists recommended voting as follows:
For: Social Democrats, Social Liberal Party, Conservative People's Party, Centre Democrats, Christian Democrats (although members were free to vote as they wish) and Liberals
Against: Socialist People's Party, June Movement, People's Movement against the EU, Danish People's Party, Progress Party and the Red-Green Alliance

Results

By County

References

History of the European Union
Referendums in Denmark
Denmark
1998 in Denmark
1998 in international relations
1998 in the European Union
Referendums related to the European Union
May 1998 events in Europe